List of rivers in Bahia (Brazilian State).

The list is arranged by drainage basin from north to south, with respective tributaries indented under each larger stream's name and ordered from downstream to upstream. All rivers in Bahia drain to the Atlantic Ocean.

By Drainage Basin

São Francisco Basin 

 São Francisco River
 Curaçá River
 Salitre River
 Jacaré River
 Vereda Pimenteira
 Verde River
 Grande River
 Preto River
 Do Ouro River
 Riachão River
 Sapão River
 Branco River
 Rio de Janeiro
 Das Balsas River
 Das Ondas River
 Das Pedras River
 São Desidério River
 Das Fêmeas River
 Galheirão River
 Roda Velha River
 Das Porcos River
 Paramirim River
 Juazeiro River
 Santo Onofre River
 Corrente River
 Das Éguas River (Correntina River)
 Arrojado River
 Do Meio River
 Guará River
 Formoso River
 Pratudão River
 Das Rãs River
 Carnaíba de Dentro River
 Carnaíba de Fora River
 Carinhanha River
 Itaguari River
 Verde Grande River
 Verde Pequeno River

Atlantic Coast 

 Vaza-Barris River
 Real River
 Itapicuru River
 Maçacara River
 Cariaçã River
 Jacuriaí River
 Peixe River
 Pedra d'Água River
 Itapicuru-Açu River
 Itapicuru-Mirim River
 Pojuca River
 Jacuípe River
 Sacraiú River
 Paraguaçu River
 Paratiji River
 Peixe River
 Paulista River
 Capivari River
 Saracura River
 Santo Antônio River
 Utinga River
 Una River
 Das Almas River (Jequiriçá River)
 Una River
 Piau River
 Jequié River
 Preto River
 Cachoeira Grande River
 De Contas River
 Gongogi River
 Jacaré River
 Gavião River
 Brumado River
 Tijuípe River
 Almada River
 Cachoeira River (Do Engenho River)
 Itacanoeira River
 Santana River
 Colônia River
 Una River
 Pardo River
 Maiquinique River
 Catolé Grande River
 Jequitinhonha River (the Rio Grande do Belmonte)
 João de Tiba River
 Buranhém River
 Do Frade River
 Caraíva River
 Jucurucu River
 Itanhaém River (Alcobaça River)
 Caravelas River
 Peruípe River
 Peruípe River (Braço Norte)
 Peruípe River (Braço Sul)
 Do Meio River
 Pau Alto River
 Mucuri River

Alphabetically 

 Almada River
 Das Almas River (Jequiriçá River)
 Arrojado River
 Das Balsas River
 Branco River
 Brumado River
 Buranhém River
 Cachoeira River (Do Engenho River)
 Cachoeira Grande River
 Capivari River
 Caraíva River
 Caravelas River
 Cariaçã River
 Carinhanha River
 Carnaíba de Dentro River
 Carnaíba de Fora River
 Catolé Grande River
 Colônia River
 De Contas River
 Corrente River
 Curaçá River
 Das Éguas River (Correntina River)
 Das Fêmeas River
 Do Frade River
 Formoso River
 Galheirão River
 Gavião River
 Gongogi River
 Grande River
 Guará River
 Itacanoeira River
 Itaguari River
 Itanhaém River
 Itapicuru River
 Itapicuru-Açu River
 Itapicuru-Mirim River
 Jacaré River
 Jacaré River
 Jacuípe River
 Jacuriaí River
 Jequié River
 Jequitinhonha River
 João de Tiba River
 Juazeiro River
 Jucurucu River
 Maçacara River
 Maiquinique River
 Do Meio River
 Do Meio River
 Do Meio River
 Mucuri River
 Das Ondas River
 Do Ouro River
 Paraguaçu River
 Paramirim River
 Paratiji River
 Pardo River
 Pau Alto River
 Paulista River
 Pedra d'Água River
 Das Pedras River
 Peixe River
 Peixe River
 Peruípe River
 Peruípe River (Braço Norte)
 Peruípe River (Braço Sul)
 Piau River
 Pojuca River
 Das Porcos River
 Pratudão River
 Preto River
 Preto River
 Das Rãs River
 Real River
 Riachão River
 Rio de Janeiro
 Roda Velha River
 Sacraiú River
 Salitre River
 Santana River
 Santo Antônio River
 Santo Onofre River
 São Desidério River
 São Francisco River
 Sapão River
 Saracura River
 Tijuípe River
 Una River
 Una River
 Una River
 Utinga River
 Vaza-Barris River
 Verde Grande River
 Verde Pequeno River
 Verde River
 Vereda Pimenteira

References
 Map from Ministry of Transport
 Rand McNally, The New International Atlas, 1993.
  GEOnet Names Server

 
Bajia
Environment of Bahia